Kavalaq may refer to:
 Kavalaq, West Azerbaijan